Igor Yurievich Kastyukevich (born December 6, 1976, Saratov) is a Russian political figure and deputy of the 8th State Duma.

In 2003 he started working in the sports development department of the Ministry of Youth Policy, Sports and Tourism of Saratov Oblast. He left the post to become the head of the combat sports center in Saratov Oblast. From 2008 to 2011, he headed the Saratov Children's and Youth Sports School in martial arts. In 2011–2020, he headed the National Aikido Council of Russia. In 2017, he was appointed the head of the department of Youth Projects of the All-Russia People's Front. Since September 2021, he has served as deputy of the 8th State Duma.

He is one of the members of the State Duma the United States Treasury sanctioned on 24 March 2022 in response to the 2022 Russian invasion of Ukraine.

On 18 April, Kastyukevich was reportedly appointed as a "mayor" for Kherson, after the city was occupied by Russian forces on 2 March. Kastyukevich denied the reports on his alleged appointment as a mayor of Kherson.

References

1976 births
Living people
United Russia politicians
21st-century Russian politicians
Eighth convocation members of the State Duma (Russian Federation)
Russian individuals subject to the U.S. Department of the Treasury sanctions
Kherson
Mayors of places in Ukraine